Topcliffe, Yorkshire may refer to:
Topcliffe, North Yorkshire
Topcliffe, West Yorkshire